The Stones may refer to:

The Rolling Stones, an English rock band formed in the 1960s, commonly referred to as "The Stones"
The Stones (market), a market in Newcastle-under-Lyme
The Stones (New Zealand band), a 1982-1983 band from Dunedin
The Stones (TV series), a 2004 television sitcom canceled after 10 episodes
Wealdstone F.C., an English football club nicknamed "The Stones"
"The Stones", a 1995 Christian song by Ray Boltz

See also
Stone (disambiguation)
The Stone (disambiguation)
Stones (disambiguation)